The name Chris has been used for seven tropical cyclones in the Atlantic Ocean.
 Tropical Storm Chris (1982), made landfall at Sabine Pass and caused widespread flooding as far inland as Tennessee, but total damage was low.
 Tropical Storm Chris (1988), caused three deaths in Puerto Rico then made landfall near Savannah, Georgia, killing one in South Carolina; monetary damage was minor.
 Hurricane Chris (1994), a Category 1 hurricane that formed in mid-Atlantic, brushed Bermuda as a tropical storm, then continued north; no significant damage.
 Tropical Storm Chris (2000), formed several hundred miles east of the Lesser Antilles, but dissipated a day later; no damage was reported.
 Tropical Storm Chris (2006), formed about 160 miles (260 km) east of the Leeward Islands; minimal damage was reported.
 Hurricane Chris (2012), a Category 1 hurricane that affected Bermuda.
 Hurricane Chris (2018), a Category 2 hurricane which formed off the coast of North Carolina.

The name Chris has also been used for three tropical cyclones in the Southern Hemisphere.
 Cyclone Chris (1982), one of the strongest tropical cyclones in the Indian Ocean on record. 
 Cyclone Chris (1991), a cyclone that formed off the coast of Western Australia.
 Cyclone Chris (2002), landfall to the east of Port Hedland, Western Australia; caused some inland flooding.

The name Chris was also used for one tropical storm in the Western Pacific Ocean.
 Tropical Storm Chris (1948), a tropical storm which formed near the Ryukyu Islands but eventually did not affect land.

Atlantic hurricane set index articles
Pacific typhoon set index articles
Australian region cyclone set index articles